Parastenostola nigroantennata is a species of beetle in the family Cerambycidae. It was described by Lin, Li, and Yang in 2008. It is known from Taiwan and China.

Subspecies
 Parastenostola nigroantennata taiwanensis Lin, Li & Yang, 2008
 Parastenostola nigroantennata nigroantennata Lin, Li & Yang, 2008

References

Saperdini
Beetles described in 2008